Gargoris was a mythical king of the Cynetes, considered part of the people of Tartessos, and, according to legend, the inventor of beekeeping.

He exiled his own son, Habis, who was adopted by a female deer and saved from the sea, and who later inherited the kingdom.

References

Further reading
 Carolina López-Ruiz. "Gargoris and Habis: A Tartessic Myth of Ancient Iberia and the Traces of Phoenician Euhemerism." Phoenix 71, no. 3/4 (2017): 265-87. Accessed June 29, 2020. www.jstor.org/stable/10.7834/phoenix.71.3-4.0265.

Tartessos
Beekeeping pioneers